Telephone is a live album by bassist Ron Carter and guitarist Jim Hall recorded at the Concord Pavilion in 1984 and released on the Concord Jazz label.

Reception

The AllMusic review by Michael Erlewine said "A live performance -- a concert. Lots of space, and a slow pace. Music to listen to, perhaps a tad too intellectual. Still... lovely".

Track listing 
 "Telephone" (Ron Carter) – 5:32
 "Indian Summer" (Victor Herbert, Al Dubin) – 5:54	
 "Candlelight" (Carter) – 4:15
 "Chorale and Dance" (Jim Hall) – 6:50
 "Alone Together" (Arthur Schwartz, Howard Dietz) – 10:29	
 "Stardust" (Hoagy Carmichael, Mitchell Parish) – 7:44
 "Two's Blues" (Hall) – 4:42

Personnel 
Ron Carter - bass 
Jim Hall – guitar

References 

Ron Carter live albums
Jim Hall (musician) live albums
1985 live albums
Concord Records live albums